Rambo is a 2008 action film directed and co-written by Sylvester Stallone, based on the character John Rambo created by author David Morrell for his novel First Blood. A sequel to Rambo III (1988), it is the fourth installment in the Rambo franchise and co-stars Julie Benz, Paul Schulze, Matthew Marsden, Graham McTavish, Rey Gallegos, Tim Kang, Jake La Botz, Maung Maung Khin, and Ken Howard. The film is dedicated to the memory of Richard Crenna, who died in 2003. Crenna had played Colonel Sam Trautman in the previous films. In the film, Rambo (reprised by Stallone) leads a group of mercenaries into Burma to rescue Christian missionaries, who have been kidnapped by a local infantry unit.

The rights to the Rambo franchise were sold to Miramax Films in 1997 after Carolco Pictures went bankrupt. Miramax intended to produce a fourth film but Stallone was unmotivated to reprise the role. The rights were then sold to Nu Image and Millennium Films in 2005, who green-lit the film before the release of Rocky Balboa (2006). Filming began in Thailand, Mexico, and the United States in January 2007, and ended in May 2007.

Rambo was theatrically released in the United States by Lionsgate Films and The Weinstein Company on January 25, 2008, and in Germany by Warner Bros. Pictures on February 8, to mixed reviews, with praise aimed at Stallone’s direction and performance, action sequences, and musical score, but criticism for its plot, excessively graphic violence, and political commentary. It grossed $113.2 million worldwide against a production budget between $47.5–50 million. The film was followed by Rambo: Last Blood, released on September 20, 2019.

Plot 

During the political protests of the Saffron Revolution in Burma, ruthless SPDC officer Major Pa Tee Tint leads Burmese regime army forces in pillaging small villages in a campaign of fear. His soldiers sadistically slaughter innocents, abduct teenage boys to be drafted into his army, and hold women hostage to be raped as sex slaves. Meanwhile, 20 years after the events in Afghanistan, Vietnam War veteran John Rambo is still living in Thailand, making a living as a snake catcher and providing boat rides. Michael Burnett, a missionary doctor, attempts to hire Rambo to ferry his group up the Salween River into Burma on a humanitarian mission to provide medical aid to a village inhabited by the Karen people. Rambo initially refuses, then agrees when convinced by Michael's fiancée Sarah Miller.

During the trip, the boat is stopped by pirates demanding Sarah in exchange for passage, forcing Rambo to kill them. The missionaries arrive at the village but are attacked by Tint's forces. Sarah, Michael, and other survivors are taken prisoners. The pastor of the missionaries' church comes to Thailand and asks Rambo to guide a team of five mercenaries on a rescue mission. Rambo takes the mercenaries to the drop-off point and offers to help, but Lewis, a former SAS soldier and the team's leader, refuses.

Myint, a Karen rebel familiar with the area, leads the mercenaries to the site of the massacre. As they survey the damage, a squad of Tint's soldiers arrive in a truck with a group of prisoners, whom they proceed to torment. Rambo arrives in time and kills the soldiers with his bow and arrow, freeing the hostages. Rambo joins the mercenaries, and they make their way to Tint's camp at night, where they stealthily rescue the surviving hostages.

The following day, Tint and his soldiers pursue them. Rambo lures a section of the army towards a dormant Tallboy bomb, setting it off with a timed claymore. Tint's forces capture everyone except Rambo, Sarah, and School Boy, the mercenaries' sniper. Before Tint can execute them, Rambo launches a surprise attack with a jeep-mounted M2 Browning heavy machine gun and opens fire on Tint's men, allowing the mercenaries to escape and engage them. The Karen rebels, led by Myint, arrive and join the fight, helping to overwhelm Tint's soldiers and their arriving naval forces. Defeated, Tint attempts to escape, but Rambo intercepts and kills him with his machete.

In the aftermath, Rambo, inspired by Sarah's words, returns to the United States to visit his father at his home in Bowie, Arizona.

Cast 

 Sylvester Stallone as John Rambo
 Julie Benz as Sarah Miller
 Paul Schulze as Michael Burnett	
 Matthew Marsden as School Boy
 Graham McTavish as Lewis
 Tim Kang as En-Joo 
 Rey Gallegos as Diaz 
 Jake La Botz as Reese
 Maung Maung Khin as Major Pa Tee Tint
 Ken Howard as Father Arthur Marsh
 Supakorn Kitsuwon as Myint 
 Aung Aay Noi as Lieutenant Aye 
 Sornram Patchimtasanakarn as Tha

Production

Development and writing 
The film was an independent production between Nu Image and Emmett/Furla Films for Equity Pictures Medienfonds GmbH. It was green-lit and sold before Rocky Balboa was released. In between the making of the third and fourth films in the Rambo franchise, the films' original producer, Carolco Pictures, went out of business. In 1997, Miramax purchased the Rambo franchise. The following year, Miramax subsidiary Dimension Films intended to make another film, and a writer was hired to write the script, but attempts to make it were deterred by Stallone, who had stated that he no longer wanted to make action movies. In 2005, the studio sold those rights to Millennium Films and Nu Image.

Stallone had stated that part of the reason that it took so long to produce a fourth film was due to a lack of a compelling story that motivated him to return to the role. An early idea was to have Rambo travel to Mexico to rescue a kidnapped young girl. Stallone thought it was "good", however, he felt the idea lacked the "essence of Rambo", still wanting the character to be a "lost man wandering the world". The premise would later be used for Rambo: Last Blood (2019). Stallone got the idea to set the film in Burma from the United Nations, which he later pitched to producers.

The producers found the idea compelling after visiting Karen refugee camps. Maung Maung Khin is a former Karen freedom fighter and stated that if he accepted the role of the film's villain, there was a chance some of his family would have been incarcerated in Burma, but accepted the role regardless, feeling that bringing awareness of the Saffron Revolution was important.

Pre-production 
A different director was originally attached to direct the film but left due to creative disagreements. Stallone was reluctant to direct the film due to not being prepared nor having a vision for the film but later became excited when he came up with the idea of "what if the film was directed by Rambo? What if the film had his personality?" Graham McTavish later echoed this idea, stating, "In many ways, Rambo directed the movie." Paul Schulze stated that there were rewrites by Stallone nearly every morning. The film had a production crew of 560 people, including 450 Thai crew members, and over 80 foreign members from Australia, America, Canada, Myanmar and the United Kingdom.

Filming 
Stallone stated that due to the small production budget the only way to make the film memorable was to make it graphically violent. He said "we were all sitting around in looking at the small production budget. Then I said  'Hey, fake blood is cheap, lets make it all-out bloody.'" Filming started on January 22, 2007, and ended on May 4, 2007. It was shot in Chiang Mai, Thailand as well as in Mexico and the United States in Arizona and California. While filming near Burma, Stallone and the rest of the crew narrowly avoided being shot by the Burmese military. Stallone described Burma as a "hellhole". He said, "We had shots fired above our heads" and that he "witnessed survivors with legs cut off and all kinds of land-mine injuries, maggot-infested wounds and ears cut off."

Post-production 
John Rambo was the original working title for the film but was changed in the US because Stallone thought that audiences might think that this is the final film in the Rambo series, due to the then recently released Rocky Balboa (2006), which was not his original intent. In many other countries, the title John Rambo is used because the first Rambo film was known as Rambo in those countries. The film premiered on US television as Rambo, but the title sequence referred to it as John Rambo.

On October 12, 2007, Lionsgate Films announced that the film title was being changed to Rambo: To Hell and Back. After some negative feedback from the online community, Stallone spoke with Harry Knowles and said:
Lionsgate jumped the gun on this. I just was thinking that the title John Rambo was derivative of Rocky Balboa and might give people the idea that this is the last Rambo film, and I don't necessarily feel that it will be. He's definitely a superb athlete, there's no reason he can't continue onto another adventure. Like John Wayne with The Searchers.

Music 

Brian Tyler composed the original score for the film. Stallone wanted Tyler to incorporate Jerry Goldsmith's original themes into the film. He did not rely on Goldsmith's actual theme, though he based his own theme and orchestrations on the style of the original to maintain the musical series. The soundtrack comprises 20 tracks.

Release

Home media 
The DVD and Blu-ray Disc were released in the United States on May 27, 2008. The DVD was released in a single disc edition and 2-disc edition. The DVD was released in the UK on June 23, 2008. The film was the 19th best selling DVD of 2008 with 1.7m units sold and an overall gross of $41,811,370. In 2010, the film was included into the DVD and Blu-ray release of the Rambo: Complete Collector's Set. The film was released on 4K Ultra HD on September 3, 2019, featuring the theatrical and extended cut.

In the United States and Canada, the DVD earned $40 million, and the Blu-ray earned $2.2 million, totaling $42.3 million in domestic video sales.

Extended cut 
During a panel at San Diego Comic-Con 2008, Cliff Stephenson announced that a "slightly different, slightly longer version of Rambo" will be released in 2009. The extended cut premiered at the 2008 Zurich Film Festival. The extended cut was released exclusively on Blu-ray on July 27, 2010, and runs at 99 minutes. The extended cut was marketed as Rambo: Extended Cut but the film itself replaces the original title card with the original working title John Rambo. The extended cut restructures the film and restores most of the deleted scenes from the Blu-ray and 2-disc DVD of the theatrical cut. The Blu-ray features a 7.1 DTS-HD mix, and an 84-minute production diary titled "Rambo: To Hell and Back". The extended cut premiered on Spike TV on July 11, 2010, two weeks before its Blu-ray debut and to commemorate Stallone's then-latest film The Expendables.

Reception

Box office 
Rambo opened in 2,751 North American theaters on January 25, 2008, and grossed $6,490,000 on its opening day, and $18,200,000 over its opening weekend. It was the second highest-grossing movie for the weekend in the U.S. and Canada behind Meet the Spartans.
The film has a box office gross of $113,344,290, of which $42,754,105 was from Canada and the United States.

Europe's biggest cinema chain (and the third biggest in the world), Odeon, refused to show the film on any of its screens in the United Kingdom, due to a dispute with its British distributor Sony Pictures over rental terms for the film. The film was shown in Ireland and the United Kingdom by other theater chains such as Empire Cinemas, Vue, Cineworld and Ward Anderson. The film was not shown in the French-speaking part of Switzerland due to legal and commercial problems with the distributor, even if it was available on screens of France and the Swiss German-speaking part.

Critical response 
Rambo received mixed reviews, with critics praising the film's action sequences and Stallone's performance, but criticizing the film's excessive violence. The site's critical consensus reads: "Sylvester Stallone knows how to stage action sequences, but the movie's uneven pacing and excessive violence (even for the franchise) is more nauseating than entertaining." On Metacritic, the film has a weighted average score of 46 out of 100, based on 26 critics, indicating "mixed or average reviews". Audiences polled by CinemaScore gave the film an average grade of "A−" on an A+ to F scale.

In his review for The New York Times, A.O. Scott wrote, "Mr. Stallone is smart enough—or maybe dumb enough, though I tend to think not—to present the mythic dimensions of the character without apology or irony. His face looks like a misshapen chunk of granite, and his acting is only slightly more expressive, but the man gets the job done. Welcome back."  Michael H. Price of Fort Worth Business Press wrote, "Stallone invests the role with a realistic acceptance of the aging process, and with traces reminiscent of Humphrey Bogart in 1951's The African Queen and Clint Eastwood in 1992's Unforgiven — to say nothing of the influences that the original First Blood had absorbed from Marlon Brando in 1953's The Wild One and Tom Laughlin in 1971's Billy Jack."

When asked what his take on the film was, First Blood writer David Morrell said:I'm happy to report that overall I'm pleased. The level of violence might not be for everyone, but it has a serious intent. This is the first time that the tone of my novel First Blood has been used in any of the movies. It's spot-on in terms of how I imagined the character — angry, burned-out, and filled with self-disgust because Rambo hates what he is and yet knows it's the only thing he does well. ...  I think some elements could have been done better, [but] I think this film deserves a solid three stars.

In an interview with The Hollywood Reporter, Stallone singled out the movie as one of his best films:
One film I’m truly proud of — it’s the best action film I’ve ever done because it’s the most truthful — is Rambo IV, dealing with Burma, where they’ve had a civil war for 67 years. But I got excoriated because the movie’s so violent. And it is violent. It’s horrifying. It’s children being burnt alive. That’s what makes civil war worse than anything: It’s your neighbor, all of a sudden, killing you. I was really happy with that film, and I never thought it would ever reach the theater. I thought, “They’re never going to show this.

Reception in Burma 
The film is banned by the Burmese government. Upon release, the then-ruling military junta ordered DVD vendors in Burma not to distribute the film due to the movie's content. Despite having never been released there theatrically or on DVD, bootleg versions of Rambo are available. The opposition youth group Generation Wave copied and distributed the film as anti-Tatmadaw propaganda.

The Karen National Liberation Army has said that the movie gave them a great boost of morale. Some rebels in Burma have even adopted dialogue from the movie (most notably "Live for nothing, or die for something") as rallying points and battle cries. "That, to me," said Stallone, "is one of the proudest moments I've ever had in film." Also, overseas Burmese have praised the movie for its vivid portrayal of the military's oppression of the Karen people.

Sequel 

In 2009, Stallone announced plans for a fifth film titled Rambo V: The Savage Hunt. The film would have been loosely based on Hunter by James Byron Huggins and would have focused on Rambo leading an elite special forces kill team to hunt and kill a genetically engineered creature. In 2011, Sean Hood was hired to write a new script, separate from The Savage Hunt, titled Rambo: Last Stand that Hood described was "more in line with the small-town thriller of First Blood". In 2012, Hood revealed that Rambo V was on hold while Stallone finishes The Expendables 2 (2012). Hood also revealed his uncertainty whether the film will be similar to Unforgiven or will be a passing-of-the-torch. In 2016, Sylvester Stallone revealed that Rambo V was no longer in production.

In May 2018, Rambo V was re-announced and was scheduled to begin filming in September with the plot focusing on Rambo taking on a Mexican drug cartel. Stallone was confirmed to be co-writing the script with Matt Cirulnick, but was unlikely to direct. That same month, Stallone confirmed that the film was scheduled for a fall 2019 release. In August 2018, Adrian Grunberg was announced as the director. Principal photography began in October 2018. Rambo: Last Blood was theatrically released in the United States on September 20, 2019.

Notes

References

Sources

External links 

 
 

2008 films
2000s action adventure films
American action adventure films
American sequel films
Censored films
Political controversies in film
Obscenity controversies in film
Film controversies in Myanmar
Films about United States Army Special Forces
Films directed by Sylvester Stallone
Films scored by Brian Tyler
Films set in Arizona
Films set in Myanmar
Films set in Thailand
Films shot in Arizona
Films shot in California
Films shot in Mexico
Films with screenplays by Sylvester Stallone
Films shot in Thailand
Rambo (franchise)
MoviePass Films films
Nu Image films
Lionsgate films
The Weinstein Company films
American splatter films
Films about mercenaries
2000s English-language films
Films produced by Avi Lerner
2000s American films